Desmoxytes golovatchi, is a species of millipede in the family Paradoxosomatidae, that can be found in Thailand (Kanchanaburi Province).

References 

golovatchi
Arthropods of Thailand
Animals described in 2018